4/4 may refer to:
 time
 April 4
4/4 (EP series)

See also
Four by four (disambiguation)